Centaure was a 74-gun ship of the line of the French Navy, launched at Toulon in 1757. She was designed by Joseph-Marie-Blaise Coulomb and named on 25 October 1755, and built under his supervision at Toulon. In French service she carried 74 cannon, comprising: 28 x 36-pounders on the lower deck, 30 x 18-pounders on the upper deck, 10 x 8-pounders on the quarterdeck, 6 x 8-pounders on the forecastle.

The Royal Navy captured Centaure at the Battle of Lagos on 18 August 1759, and commissioned her as the third-rate HMS Centaur.

Career in British service

She had a skirmish with the French ships Vaillant and Amethyste, in January 1760. In the War of American Independence, Centaur served continuously on the North America/West Indies station, taking part in all the major battles including Admiral Rodney's victory at the Saintes.

Loss

In September 1782, Centaur was one of the ships escorting prizes and a large trade convoy back to Britain from Jamaica, when she foundered due to damage received in the 1782 Central Atlantic hurricane near the Grand Banks of Newfoundland. Captain John Nicholson Inglefield, along with eleven of his crew, survived the wreck in one of the ship's pinnaces, arriving at the Azores after sailing in an  open boat for 16 days without compass quadrant or sail, and only two quart bottles of water; some 400 of her crew perished.

See also
List of ships captured in the 18th century

Notes

References

Lavery, Brian (2003) The Ship of the Line – Volume 1: The development of the battlefleet 1650–1850. Conway Maritime Press. .
Winfield, Rif and Roberts, Stephen S., French Warships in the Age of Sail 1626-1786: Design, Construction, Careers and Fates. (Seaforth Publishing, 2017) .
  John Nicholson Inglefield, Captain Inglefield's narrative concerning the loss of the 'Centaur', 1783

External links
 

Centaure (1757)
Ships of the line of the Royal Navy
Shipwrecks in the Atlantic Ocean
1757 ships
Maritime incidents in 1782
Captured ships